Philipp Schlachter (June 17, 1841 – September 9, 1923) was a German-born soldier who fought for the Union Army during the American Civil War. He received the Medal of Honor for valor.

Biography
Schlachter received the Medal of Honor in December 1, 1864 for his actions at the Battle of Spotsylvania Court House, Virginia on May 12, 1864 while with Company F of the 73rd New York Volunteer Infantry Regiment.

Medal of Honor citation

Citation:

The President of the United States of America, in the name of Congress, takes pleasure in presenting the Medal of Honor to Private Philipp Schlachter, United States Army, for extraordinary heroism on 12 May 1864, while serving with Company F, 73d New York Infantry, in action at Spotsylvania, Virginia, for capture of flag of 15th Louisiana Infantry (Confederate States of America).

See also

List of American Civil War Medal of Honor recipients: Q–S

References

External links

1841 births
1923 deaths
Union Army soldiers
United States Army Medal of Honor recipients
American Civil War recipients of the Medal of Honor
German-born Medal of Honor recipients
German emigrants to the United States